Proton (Russian: Протон) (formal designation: UR-500) is an expendable launch system used for both commercial and Russian government space launches. The first Proton rocket was launched in 1965. Modern versions of the launch system are still in use as of 2022, making it one of the most successful heavy boosters in the history of spaceflight. The components of all Protons are manufactured at the Khrunichev State Research and Production Space Center factory in Moscow and Chemical Automatics Design Bureau in Voronezh, then transported to the Baikonur Cosmodrome, where they are assembled at Site 91 to form the launch vehicle. Following payload integration, the rocket is then brought to the launch pad horizontally by rail, and raised into vertical position for launch.

As with many Soviet rockets, the names of recurring payloads became associated with the launch vehicle itself. The moniker "Proton" originates from a series of similarly named scientific satellites, which were among the rocket's first payloads. During the Cold War, it was designated the D-1/D-1e or SL-12/SL-13 by Western intelligence agencies.

Commercial launches are marketed by International Launch Services (ILS).

In 2013, the rocket was intended to be retired before 2030.

, production on the Proton rocket is ceasing as the new Angara launch vehicle comes on line and becomes operational. No new launch service contracts for Proton are likely to be signed.

History
Proton started its life as a "super heavy ICBM". It was designed to launch a 100-megaton (or larger) thermonuclear weapon over a distance of 13,000 km. It was hugely oversized for an ICBM and was never deployed in such a capacity. It was eventually used as a space launch vehicle. It was the brainchild of Vladimir Chelomei's design bureau as a foil to Sergei Korolev's N1 rocket, whose purpose was to send a two-man Zond spacecraft around the Moon; Korolev openly opposed Proton and Chelomei's other designs for their use of toxic propellants. The unusual appearance of the first stage results from the need to transport components by rail. The central oxidizer tank is the maximum width for the loading gauge of the track. The six tanks surrounding it carry fuel and serve as the attachment points for the engines. Despite resembling strap-on boosters, they are not designed to separate from the central oxidizer tank. The first and second stages are connected by a lattice structure. The second stage engine ignites shortly before separation of the first stage and the lattice allows the exhaust to escape.

A rushed development program led to dozens of failures between 1965 and 1972. Proton did not complete its State Trials until 1977, at which point it was judged to have a higher than 90% reliability.

Proton's design was kept secret until 1986, with the public being only shown the upper stages in film clips and photographs, and the first time the complete vehicle was shown to the outside world happened during the televised launch of Mir.

Mass-production of guidance, navigation and control system for Proton has begun in 1964 on "Communard" Industrial Association (Kharkov, Ukraine).

Proton launched the uncrewed Soviet circumlunar flights and was intended to have launched the first crewed Soviet circumlunar spaceflights, before the United States flew the Apollo 8 mission. Proton launched the Salyut space stations, the Mir core segment and expansion modules, and both the Zarya and Zvezda modules of the ISS.

Proton also launches commercial satellites, most of them being managed by International Launch Services. The first ILS Proton launch was on 9 April 1996 with the launch of the SES Astra 1F communications satellite.

Between 1994 and mid-2010, Proton revenues were $4.3 billion, and were projected to grow to $6 billion by 2011.

In January 2017, the Proton was temporarily grounded due to the manufacturer, Voronezh Mechanical Plant, having substituted a heat-resistant alloy in the engines with a cheaper metal.

In June 2018, the state corporation Roscosmos announced that the Proton rocket would cease production as the new Angara launch vehicle comes on line and becomes operational. No new launch service contracts for Proton are likely to be signed.

Proton flew its last scheduled commercial mission on 9 October 2019, delivering Eutelsat 5 West B and Mission Extension Vehicle-1 to geostationary orbit. A number of Roscosmos and other Russian government missions remain on Proton launch manifest.

Proton K

Proton K is fuelled by very toxic unsymmetrical dimethyl hydrazine and nitrogen tetroxide. These are hypergolic fuels which ignite on contact, avoiding the need for an ignition system, and can be stored at ambient temperatures. This avoids the need for components that are tolerant of low temperatures, and allows the rocket to remain on the pad indefinitely (other launchers with such capability include the U.S. Titan II GLV, Titan III, and Titan IV, the Chinese Long March 2 and Long March 4, the Soviet/Ukrainian Tsyklon launchers, the Soviet/Russian Kosmos-3 and Kosmos-3M launchers and the European Ariane 1 to Ariane 4 launchers). In contrast, cryogenic fuels need periodic replenishment as they boil off.

The fourth stage has multiple variants, depending on the mission. The simplest, Blok D, was used for interplanetary missions. Blok D had no guidance module, depending on the probe to control flight. Three different Blok DM versions (DM, DM2, and DM-2M) were for high Earth orbits. The Blok D/DM were unusual in that the fuel was stored in a toroidal tank, around the engine and behind the oxidizer tank.

The initial Proton tests in 1965–66 only used the first two stages of the booster, the complete four-stage vehicle being flown for the first time in 1967. When the Soviet space station program began in 1971, Protons began being flown with the Blok D removed for use as a heavy-lift LEO launcher.

Proton-K payloads included all of the Soviet Union's Salyut space stations, almost all Mir modules (with the exception of the Docking Module, which was launched on the United States Space Shuttle), and the Zarya and Zvezda modules of the International Space Station. It was intended to launch the crewed TKS spacecraft, prior to the cancellation of that programme, although a few robotic flights of spacecraft were fulfilled. In addition it was intended to launch the 1970s LKS spaceplane that was never realised.

Proton-M

The initial version of Proton M, could launch  into geostationary orbit or  into a geostationary transfer orbit.

The Proton M's improvements included lower stage modifications to reduce structural mass, increase thrust, and fully use propellants. Generally a Briz-M ( meaning Breeze) storable propellant upper stage is used instead of the Blok D or Blok DM stage, removing the need for multiple fuel supplies and oxygen top-off due to boiling; the Proton-M also flew with a Blok-DM upper stage. Efforts were also made to reduce dependency on foreign (usually Ukrainian) component suppliers. With the Briz-M upper stage, the payload fairing diameter is 4.1 m (13.45 ft).

Proton launch vehicles and Briz-M upper stages are designed and built by Khrunichev State Research and Production Space Center (Khrunichev) in Moscow, the majority owner of International Launch Services (ILS). The center is home to all engineering, assembly and test functions of Proton production. With the recent consolidation of the Russian space enterprises, Khrunichev has direct oversight and control of up to 70% of all Proton manufacturing from suppliers to manufacturers. The consolidation directly supports Khrunichev's ongoing efforts for vertical integration of Proton production.

An enhanced variant, the Phase III Proton-M/Briz-M launch vehicle, was flight proven on the Russian Federal dual mission of Express AM-44 and Express MD-1 in February 2009 and performed its first commercial launch in March 2010 with the Echostar XIV satellite. The Proton-M/Briz-M phase III configuration provides 6150 kg of GTO performance, an increase of 1150 kg over the original Proton-M Briz-M, while maintaining the fundamental design configuration.

On 6 August 2012, the Russian Federal Space Agency lost a Russian and an Indonesian communications satellite in an attempt to launch them into orbit on a Proton-M due to technical difficulties with the last stage.

On 2 July 2013, a Proton-M launching three GLONASS navigation satellites experienced a failure reminiscent of the 1960s disasters shortly after liftoff when the booster crashed near LC-39 at Baikonour, ending a 30-year unbroken stretch without a first stage failure; all future Proton flights were suspended pending investigation. The accident was eventually determined to be caused by the rate gyro package having been installed upside-down. Due to the difficulty of installing the package incorrectly, it was widely suspected that it had been done deliberately by a disgruntled or drunk worker at the Khrunichev plant.

On 15 May 2014, a Proton-M/Briz-M carrying an Ekspress satellite suffered a third stage failure from a bad turbopump bearing. Debris fell in Manchuria. On 21 October, another Ekspress satellite was left in a useless orbit when the Briz stage cut off 24 seconds too early.

On 16 May 2015, a MEXSAT communications satellite failed to orbit due to another third stage malfunction, the eighth Proton failure since 2010.

Khrunichev has initiated development of a set of phase IV enhancements in order to keep pace with market demands and the mass growth trends of commercial satellites. The implementation of Phase IV Proton Briz-M enhancements were completed in 2016. The payload mass performance for phase IV has been increased to 6320 kg to a reference GTO orbit with 1500 m/s of residual delta V to GSO.

Future developments
Significant upgrades were temporarily put on hold following announcement (in 1992) of the new Angara launch vehicle. The single largest upgrade  was the KVRB stage. This cryogenic stage would have greatly increased capacity. The engine was developed successfully, and the stage as a whole had progressed to hardware. However, as KVRB is noticeably larger than Block D, the vehicle's aerodynamics, flight control, software, and possibly electronics would have to be reevaluated. In addition, the launch pad can supply existing Protons with common hypergolic fuels from single sources. The upper stages, in particular, are fed by common loading pipes running along the rocket. Switching to a stage with different fuels requires the addition of extra support articles; switching to cryogens requires that such support articles top off the stage periodically.

Heavy variants of Angara will be simpler and cheaper than Proton (and like the Atlas V rocket, will not use hypergolic fuels; instead, it will use the same RP-1 fuel as that used on the Soyuz rocket). They will also be designed from the start to accept a KVTK stage, and will already have a liquid oxygen supply at the pad; only a hydrogen supply will be called upon.

See also
 Comparison of orbital launchers families
 Comparison of orbital launch systems

Similar launch systems

 Delta IV Heavy
 Atlas V Heavy
 Ariane 5
 Long March 5
 Angara A5
 Falcon 9
 H-IIB
 Saturn I and IB
 Heavy-lift launch vehicle

References

External links

Proton launches page on LyngSat
Proton rocket specifications sheet
Proton M Debuts With Successful Ekran Launch on April 7, 2001
Proton 8K82K / Briz-M. Astronautix.
FAS – Proton Launch Vehicle
ILS Proton
Proton launch schedules on Satlaunch
Слабое звено – "Бриз-М"

1967 in spaceflight
1971 in spaceflight
1972 in spaceflight
1973 in spaceflight
Space launch vehicles of Russia
Soviet inventions
Universal Rocket (rocket family)
Space launch vehicles of the Soviet Union
Rocket families